The Tibetan stone loach (Triplophysa stolickai) is a species of ray-finned fish in the family Nemacheilidae. The specific name is sometimes spelled stoliczkae but the original spelling used by Steindachner is stoličkai. It is found in southern and central Asia.

Etymology
The stone loach is named in honor of paleontologist Ferdinand Stoliczka (1838-1874). Stoliczka was the one who collected the type specimen.

References

Triplophysa
Freshwater fish of Asia
Fauna of Tibet
Freshwater fish of China
Freshwater fish of India
Fish of Afghanistan
Fish of Iran
Fish of Pakistan
Fish of Central Asia
Fish described in 1866
Taxa named by Franz Steindachner